Inta is a feminine Latvian given name and may refer to:  
Inta Ezergailis (1932–2005), Latvian American literary critic and poet 
Inta Feldmane, (born 1959) Latvian politician 
Inta Kļimoviča (born 1951), athlete 
Inta Purviņa (born 1940), Latvian politician 
Inta Ruka (born 1958), Latvian photographer

References

Latvian feminine given names
Feminine given names